The men's normal hill individual ski jumping competition for the 1992 Winter Olympics was held in Tremplin du Praz. It occurred on 9 February.

Results

References

Ski jumping at the 1992 Winter Olympics